The Beatles: The First U.S. Visit is a 1990 re-edited version of renowned documentary filmmaking team Albert and David Maysles' 1964 16mm documentary What's Happening! The Beatles in the U.S.A., about the Beatles' first visit to America in February 1964. It documents the Beatles' US trip as they travel to New York City, Washington, D.C., and Miami Beach. Footage of the Beatles (often acting irreverently in front of the camera) in hotel rooms makes up the majority of the non-musical portion of the film.

The main difference between the original 1964 documentary and the 1990 re-edited version is that 22 minutes of the Beatles' live recorded performances on The Ed Sullivan Show have been inserted in the 1990 release. However, as the 1964 documentary is 81 minutes long and the 1990 version is 83 minutes, some 20 minutes of the 1964 documentary have been excluded, such as several scenes with Brian Epstein.

The original film premiered on 13 November 1964 as a special episode of the CBS variety series The Entertainers. It is still being shown at various festivals, such as the Silverdocs in 2008, and was also shown at a special screening at the Maysles Cinema in New York on 18 November 2011 in honour of Albert Maysles' 85th birthday.

Track listing

The Ed Sullivan Show (NYC #1)
 "All My Loving"
 "Till There Was You"
 "She Loves You"
 "I Want to Hold Your Hand"

The Washington Coliseum Concert
 "I Saw Her Standing There"
 "I Wanna Be Your Man"
 "She Loves You"

The Ed Sullivan Show (Miami)
 "From Me to You"
 "This Boy"
 "All My Loving"

The Ed Sullivan Show (NYC #2)
 "Twist and Shout"
 "Please Please Me"
 "I Want to Hold Your Hand"

In addition to the live performances, there are also studio Beatles recordings heard on the program's soundtrack. Among them are "She Loves You", "I Saw Her Standing There", "Love Me Do", "I Want To Hold Your Hand" and "It Won't Be Long". Other recordings featured are "Navy Blue" by Diane Renay and "Pride and Joy" by Marvin Gaye.

Certifications

Footnotes

External links
 Article about the film on the Beatles official website
 The Beatles: The First U.S. Visit at IMDB
 Article in The Huffington Post about the 1964 documentary Retrieved 2012-01-28

Documentary films about the Beatles
1991 films
1990s English-language films